Sherry Kramer is an American playwright, born in Springfield, Missouri.  Kramer attended Wellesley College, as an undergraduate, and earned two master's degrees from the University of Iowa. She teaches playwriting at Bennington College.

References

External links
• Official website

American dramatists and playwrights
Living people
Year of birth missing (living people)
Wellesley College alumni
University of Iowa alumni